Tomrair mac Ailchi, or Thormod/Thorir Helgason, was the Viking jarl and prince who reestablished the preexisting small Norse base or settlement at Limerick as a powerful kingdom in 922 overnight when he is recorded arriving there with a huge fleet from an unknown place of departure. His ancestry is uncertain but he evidently did not belong to the Uí Ímair dynasty who only a few years before had reestablished themselves in the Kingdom of Dublin, of which Tomrair, the first King of Limerick, would immediately make himself the chief rival.

Notes

References

Primary sources
  Annals of Clonmacnoise, translated by Connell MacGeoghagen (1627), ed. Denis Murphy (1896), The Annals of Clonmacnoise. Dublin: Royal Society of Antiquaries of Ireland.
 Annals of the Four Masters, ed. & tr. John O'Donovan (2nd ed., 1856), Annála Rioghachta Éireann. Annals of the Kingdom of Ireland by the Four Masters... with a Translation and Copious Notes. 7 vols. Dublin: Royal Irish Academy. CELT versions. Full scans at Internet Archive: Vol. I. Vol. II. Vol. III. Vol. IV. Vol. V. Vol. VI. Indices.
 Annals of Inisfallen, ed. & tr. Seán Mac Airt (1944), The Annals of Inisfallen (MS. Rawlinson B. 503). Dublin: DIAS. Electronic edition and translation at CELT.
 Annals of Ulster, ed. & tr. Seán Mac Airt and Gearóid Mac Niocaill (1983). The Annals of Ulster (to AD 1131). DIAS. edition and translation available at CELT.
 Chronicon Scotorum, ed. & tr. Gearóid Mac Niocaill (2003). Chronicon Scotorum. Unpublished manuscript made available to UCC.  edition and translation available at CELT.
  Cogad Gáedel re Gallaib, ed. & tr. James Henthorn Todd (1867). Cogadh Gaedhel re Gallaibh: The War of the Gaedhil with the Gaill. London: Longmans.
Secondary sources
 Downham, Clare, Viking Kings of Britain and Ireland: The Dynasty of Ívarr to A.D. 1014. Edinburgh: Dunedin. 2007.
 Lee, Timothy, "The Northmen of Limerick", in Journal of the Royal Historical and Archaeological Association of Ireland, Fourth Series, Vol. 9, No. 80 (Jul. – Oct., 1889): 227–231. JSTOR
 Ní Mhaonaigh, Máire, "Cogad Gáedel Re Gallaib and the Annals: A Comparison", in Ériu 47 (1996): 101–26. JSTOR
 Steenstrup, Johannes C. H. R., Normannerne, Vols. 3–4. Copenhagen: Forlagt af Rudolph Klein, I. Cohens Bogtrykkeri. 1882. alternative scan
 Valante, Mary A., The Vikings in Ireland: Settlement, Trade and Urbanization. Four Courts Press. 2008.

Kings of Limerick
Viking rulers
10th-century Irish monarchs
10th-century Vikings